The  2017 PGA Championship was the 99th PGA Championship, held August 10–13 at Quail Hollow Club in Charlotte, North Carolina. This was the first major at Quail Hollow, which is a regular stop on the PGA Tour.

Early in the week of the tournament, it was announced that the championship will be held in May beginning in 2019.

Justin Thomas won his first career major title, two strokes ahead of runners-up Francesco Molinari, Louis Oosthuizen, and Patrick Reed.

Media
In the United States, the Championship was televised by CBS, with weekday and early weekend coverage on TNT. It was televised live in the United Kingdom by the BBC who secured the rights over Sky Sports who had previously screened the event since 1992.

Course layout

It was also the home of the tour's Kemper Open (1969–1979) and the senior tour's PaineWebber World Seniors Invitational in the 1980s.

Under the direction of Tom Fazio, Quail Hollow underwent an aggressive 90-day renovation in 2016 that modified four holes and added  Bermuda grass. It commenced during the final round of the Wells Fargo Championship on Sunday, May 8. Thousands of trees were removed, as the former first two holes were combined into a new first hole, and the old fifth hole was divided between the new fourth and fifth holes.

Field
The following qualification criteria were used to select the field. Each player is listed according to the first category by which he qualified with additional categories in which he qualified shown in parentheses.

1. All former PGA Champions
Rich Beem, Keegan Bradley (8), John Daly, Jason Day (6,8), Jason Dufner (8,10), Pádraig Harrington (6), Davis Love III, Rory McIlroy (4,8,9,10), Shaun Micheel, Phil Mickelson (4,8,9), Vijay Singh, Jimmy Walker (6,8,9), Yang Yong-eun
Martin Kaymer (3,6,9) did not play due to a shoulder injury.
David Toms did not play.
The following former champions did not enter: Paul Azinger, Mark Brooks, Jack Burke Jr., Steve Elkington, Dow Finsterwald, Raymond Floyd, Doug Ford, Al Geiberger, Wayne Grady, David Graham, Hubert Green, Don January, John Mahaffey, Larry Nelson, Bobby Nichols, Jack Nicklaus, Gary Player, Nick Price, Jeff Sluman, Dave Stockton, Hal Sutton, Lee Trevino, Bob Tway, Lanny Wadkins, Tiger Woods

2. Last five Masters Champions
Sergio García (8,9), Adam Scott (8), Jordan Spieth (3,4,6,8,9,10), Bubba Watson, Danny Willett (9)

3. Last five U.S. Open Champions
Dustin Johnson (8,9,10), Brooks Koepka (6,8,9,10), Justin Rose (8,9,11)

4. Last five Open Champions
Zach Johnson (9), Henrik Stenson (6,8,9)

5. Current Senior PGA Champion
Bernhard Langer did not play.

6. Top 15 and ties from the 2016 PGA Championship
Paul Casey (8), Branden Grace (8), Emiliano Grillo (8), Tyrrell Hatton, Hideki Matsuyama (8,10), William McGirt (8), Patrick Reed (8,9,10), Webb Simpson (8), Robert Streb, Daniel Summerhays

7. 20 low scorers in the 2017 PGA Professional Championship
Alex Beach, Rich Berberian, Jr., Jamie Broce, Paul Claxton, Stuart Deane, Matt Dobyns, Greg Gregory, Jaysen Hansen, Scott Hebert, Dave McNabb, Chris Moody, David Muttitt, Rod Perry, Kenny Pigman, Adam Rainaud, Mike Small, Brian Smock, Omar Uresti, Ryan Vermeer, J. J. Wood

8. Top 70 leaders in official money standings from the 2016 RBC Canadian Open to the 2017 RBC Canadian Open
Daniel Berger (10), Wesley Bryan (10), Rafa Cabrera-Bello (9), Bud Cauley, Kevin Chappell (10), Tony Finau, Tommy Fleetwood, Rickie Fowler (9,10), Lucas Glover, Bill Haas, Adam Hadwin (10), James Hahn, Brian Harman (10), Russell Henley (10), Charley Hoffman, J. B. Holmes (9), Billy Horschel (10), Charles Howell III, Mackenzie Hughes (10), Kang Sung-hoon, Kim Si-woo (10), Kevin Kisner (10), Russell Knox (10), Kelly Kraft, Matt Kuchar (9), Martin Laird, Danny Lee, Marc Leishman (10), Luke List, Jamie Lovemark, Francesco Molinari, Ryan Moore (9,10), Kevin Na, Sean O'Hair, Louis Oosthuizen, Pat Perez (10), Thomas Pieters (9), Ian Poulter, Jon Rahm (10), Patrick Rodgers, Xander Schauffele (10), Charl Schwartzel, Cameron Smith (10), Kyle Stanley (10), Brendan Steele (10), Hudson Swafford (10), Justin Thomas (10), Jhonattan Vegas (10), Gary Woodland
Brandt Snedeker (8,9) did not play due to a rib injury.

9. Members of the United States and Europe 2016 Ryder Cup teams (provided they are ranked in the top 100 in the Official World Golf Ranking on July 30)
Matt Fitzpatrick, Andy Sullivan, Lee Westwood, Chris Wood

10. Winners of tournaments co-sponsored or approved by the PGA Tour since the 2016 PGA Championship
Jonas Blixt, Bryson DeChambeau, Cody Gribble, Grayson Murray, Rod Pampling, D. A. Points, Chris Stroud

11. Winner of the 2016 Olympic Golf Tournament

12. Special invitations
An Byeong-hun, Thomas Bjørn, Patrick Cantlay, Nicolas Colsaerts, Graham DeLaet, Luke Donald, Ernie Els, Ross Fisher, Ryan Fox, Dylan Frittelli, Jim Furyk, Scott Hend, Jim Herman, Yuta Ikeda, Thongchai Jaidee, Andrew Johnston, Kim Kyung-tae, Søren Kjeldsen, Satoshi Kodaira, Anirban Lahiri, Pablo Larrazábal, Alexander Lévy, Li Haotong, David Lingmerth, Shane Lowry, Joost Luiten, Graeme McDowell, Alex Norén, Thorbjørn Olesen, Jordan Smith, Song Young-han, Richard Sterne, Brandon Stone, Steve Stricker, Hideto Tanihara, Peter Uihlein, Wang Jeung-hun, Bernd Wiesberger, Fabrizio Zanotti

13. Players below 70th place in official money standings, to fill the field
Jason Kokrak

Alternates (category 13)
Scott Brown (77th in standings; replaced David Toms)
Chez Reavie (79, took spot reserved for WGC-Bridgestone Invitational winner)
Scott Piercy (80, did not play)
Chris Kirk (81, replaced Brandt Snedeker)

Round summaries

First round
Thursday, August 10, 2017

Kevin Kisner and Thorbjørn Olesen were the co-leaders at 67 (−4), with five players one shot behind.

Second round
Friday, August 11, 2017Saturday, August 12, 2017

Following a weather delay of nearly two hours in the late afternoon, play was suspended at 8:11 pm EDT due to darkness, with 25 players remaining on the course. On the leaderboard, only Chris Stroud was affected, two-under for his round with five holes remaining. Play resumed at 7:30 am on Saturday.

Third round
Saturday, August 12, 2017

With the second round completed on Saturday morning, the third round began at 9:50 am EDT in groups of three at ten-minute intervals, with the final group at 2:00 pm.	

Source:

Final round
Sunday, August 13, 2017

Summary
Entering the final round with a one-stroke lead, Kevin Kisner failed to record a birdie on the front-nine and bogeyed the par-5 7th after hitting his approach into the water. Hideki Matsuyama birdied both 6 and 7 to tie Kisner. Justin Thomas began the round two back and tied for the lead with a  birdie putt at the 9th. Chris Stroud also birdied the ninth to tie, while Francesco Molinari's run of four birdies in five holes on his back-nine meant that five players were atop the leaderboard at seven-under.

At the par-5 tenth, Thomas' putt for birdie paused on the lip of the cup for several seconds before falling in. He then chipped in at 13 for another birdie. Matsuyama birdied the tenth to take solo possession of the lead, but made five bogeys to finish and fell to five-under. Kisner made his first birdie of the day at 10, but followed with two more bogeys. He managed to birdie both 14 and 15 before three-putting for bogey at the 16th. After a par at 17, Kisner needed to hole his approach from the fairway on the last to force a playoff, but found the water and made double bogey.

In the penultimate pairing and leading by three on the final tee, Thomas drove into a fairway bunker and then played conservatively. His third shot from the rough was to the right side of the green; he sank his short putt for bogey for 68 (−3) and 276 (−8). Patrick Reed had three birdies on the back to get to within a shot of the lead, but bogeyed the 18th after finding a fairway bunker off the tee and tied for second, two strokes behind Thomas. Molinari's chances were diminished when he also drove into a bunker at 16 and failed to get up-and-down. Louis Oosthuizen holed out from 34 yards on the par-5 15th for an eagle and birdied 18 to tie Reed and Molinari for second. With the finish Oosthuizen became the seventh golfer to finish runner-up in all four major championships. Stroud played the back-nine in six-over to fall to a tie for ninth.

Final leaderboard

Note: Top 15 and ties qualify for the 2018 PGA Championship; top 4 and ties qualify for the 2018 Masters Tournament

Source:

Scorecard

Cumulative tournament scores, relative to par

Source:

References

External links

Coverage on the PGA Tour's official site
Coverage on the European Tour's official site

PGA Championship
Golf in North Carolina
PGA Championship
PGA Championship
PGA Championship
PGA Championship